The 1990 XXVI FIBA International Christmas Tournament "Trofeo Raimundo Saporta-Memorial Fernando Martín" was the 26th edition of the FIBA International Christmas Tournament. It took place at Palacio de Deportes de la Comunidad de Madrid, Madrid, Spain, on 24, 25 and 26 December 1990 with the participations of Real Madrid Otaysa (runners-up of the 1989–90 FIBA European Cup Winners' Cup), POP 84 (champions of the 1989–90 FIBA European Champions Cup), Maccabi Elite Tel Aviv (champions of the 1989–90 Ligat HaAl) and Limoges CSP (champions of the 1989–90 Nationale 1A).

League stage

Day 1, December 24, 1990

|}

Day 2, December 25, 1990

|}

Day 3, December 26, 1990

|}

Final standings

References

1990–91 in European basketball
1990–91 in French basketball
1990–91 in Israeli basketball
1990–91 in Spanish basketball
1990–91 in Yugoslav basketball